Ctesias serra, commonly known as the cobweb beetle, is a species of beetle native to England in the family Dermestidae.

The common name relates to the habit of the larva of taking trapped insects from spiderwebs.

The preferred habitat is beneath old thick bark.

References

Dermestidae
Beetles described in 1792